Richard Grey (1457–1483) was a son of Elizabeth Woodville, queen of England.

Richard Grey may also refer to:

Richard Grey (by 1492–1533), MP for Newcastle-under-Lyme
Richard Grey, 3rd Earl of Kent (1481–1524), English peer
Richard Grey, 6th Earl Grey (1939–2013), British peer
Richard Grey (priest) (1696–1771), English doctor and Anglican archdeacon
Richard Grey, 4th Baron Grey of Codnor (1371–1418), English soldier and diplomat
Richard Grey, 3rd Earl of Tankerville (1436–c. 1466), fought for the House of York
Richard Grey, 2nd Baron Grey of Codnor (died 1335), English soldier and diplomat

See also
Richard Gray (disambiguation)
Richard de Grey (died 1271), landowner